Samarla Venkata Ranga Rao (3 July 1918 – 18 July 1974), popularly known as SVR, was an Indian actor, producer, and director known for his works majorly in Telugu and Tamil films. He is regarded as one of the finest actors in the history of Indian cinema. He is known by the epithet "Viswa Nata Chakravarthi". He was the earliest known character actor to have enjoyed a star status in South Indian cinema. In a career spanning nearly three decades, Ranga Rao garnered various national and international honours.

Ranga Rao was a method actor known for his natural acting style, portraying complex  social, biographical, and mythological  characters such as 'Nepala Manthrikudu', a tantric in Pathala Bhairavi (1951), Yama in Sati Savitri (1957), Ghatothkacha in Maya Bazaar (1957), Mayasura in Bhookailas (1958), Bhoja in Mahakavi Kalidasu (1960). In 1964, he received the Best Actor Award for his portrayal of Kichaka in Nartanasala (1963) at the third Afro-Asian Film Festival held in Jakarta, becoming the only Indian actor to have ever garnered the honour. He then essayed Duryodhana in the blockbuster Pandava Vanavasam (1965), Hiranyakasipu in Bhakta Prahlada (1967), and Ravana in Sampoorna Ramayanam (1971) to name a few.

He made his foray as a character actor in films such as Mana Desam (1949), Palletoori Pilla (1950), Devadasu (1953), Bangaru Papa (1954), Raju Peda (1954), Thodi Kodallu (1957), Chenchu Lakshmi (1958), Pelli Naati Pramanalu (1958), Nammina Bantu (1959), Gundamma Katha (1962), Sarada (1962), Aatma Bandhuvu (1962), Annai (1962),  Karpagam (1963), Naanum Oru Penn (1963), Bobbili Yuddham (1964),  Bandhavyalu (1968), Prema Nagar (1971), Dasara Bullodu (1971), Pandanti Kapuram (1972), Vasantha Maligai (1972), Thatha-Manavadu (1973), and Andaru Dongale (1974).

Government of Andhra Pradesh instituted an award in his memory, presented every year to the best character acting performance, known as the S. V. Ranga Rao Award for Best Character Actor.

Early life
Ranga Rao was born in Nuziveedu in erstwhile Krishna District of Andhra Pradesh in 1918 in a Telugu zamindari family of Naidu caste. His father, Samarla Koteswara Rao, was an excise inspector at Nuzvidu, and his mother's name was Smt. Lakshmi Narasayamma. His grandfather was working as a doctor in the town. He had relatives scattered in East Godavari district. His grandfather, Kotayya Naidu, lived in Chengalpattu, Tamil Nadu.

His mother, Lakshmi Narasayamma, a staunch devotee of Lord Venkateswara, named the boy after him. Ranga Rao was sent to Madras, where he completed his schooling at Hindu College. He also studied in Eluru and Visakhapatnam. At an early age of 12, he showed interest in stage acting. He ventured into acting after completing his bachelor's degree in sciences.

Career

S. V. R. got an invitation from one of his relatives, B. V. Ramanandam, to play the lead actor in his film Varoodhini (1947). He immediately abandoned the job, and left for Salem to join the celluloid world. However, the film didn’t do well at the box office.

S. V. R. left Madras Presidency and reached Jamshedpur, where he took up the job as a budget assistant with the Tata company. However, his love for theatre began to bloom multifold. At this juncture, he married Badeti Leelavathi on 27 December 1947. In the days that followed, S. V. R. was given an opportunity to appear in Palletoori Pilla (1950), produced by B. A. Subba Rao. Shavukaru (1950) earned him recognition as a fine actor.

His role as the antagonist 'Nepala Manthrikudu', a tantric in Pathala Bhairavi (1951) was a turning point in his career. The film became a breakthrough for both Ranga Rao and the lead actor N. T. Rama Rao. Pathala Bhairavi was the only south Indian film screened at the first International Film Festival of India. Ranga Rao also starred in the enduring classics Mayabazar (1957) and Nartanasala (1963), featured in the CNN-IBN's list of "100 greatest Indian films of all time".

In a career spanning nearly three decades, he acted in over 160 films 109 in Telugu and 53 in Tamil. He was one of the earliest stars to feature in commercials and his ad for the popular cigarette brand Berkeley, was extremely popular.

Characters essayed

 Akbar in Anarkali
 Banasura in Usha Parinayam
 Bhishma in Bala Bharatam
 Bhoja in Mahakavi Kalidasu
 Daksha in Dakshayagnam
 Duryodhana in Pandava Vanavasam
 Ghatotkacha in Mayabazar
 Harischandra in Harischandra
 Hiranyakashipu in Bhakta Prahlada
 Kamsa in Yashoda Krishna and Srikrishna Leelalu
 Keechaka in Narthanasala
 Mayasura in Bhookailas
 Narakasura in Vinayaka Chaviti
 Narakasura in Deepavali
 Rajaraja Narendra in Sarangadhara
 Ravana in Sampoorna Ramayanam
 Tandra Paparayudu in Bobbili Yuddham
 Ugrasena in Guna Sundari
 Yama in Sati Savitri

Personal life
Ranga Rao married Leelavati, daughter of Badeti Venkata Ramayya and Koteswaramma on 27 December 1947. They have three children: two daughters, Vijaya and Prameela and a son, Koteswara Rao.

Ranga Rao wanted to launch his son into films and shot a few portions. But the film didn’t take off for unknown reasons. He was a pet-lover, owned two German Shepherds at his residence. Ranga Rao was a poet and also wrote short stories for a few publications and nurtured a love for cricket, painting, hunting.

Death 
Ranga Rao had a cardiac arrest at Hyderabad in February 1974. He was admitted to Osmania General Hospital, and then discharged. Another attack on 18 July 1974 at Madras proved fatal and the actor died before any medical treatment could be administered.

Legacy 

Government of Andhra Pradesh instituted an award in his memory, presented every year to the best character acting performance, known as the S. V. Ranga Rao Award for Best Character Actor.

A bust-size bronze statue of Ranga Rao was unveiled by popular actor Chiranjeevi at Tummalapall Kalakshetram in Vijayawada in 2010. In 2018, N. Chandrababu Naidu, then Chief Minister of Andhra Pradesh unveiled a 12.5 feet bronze statue of Ranga Rao at Kalaparru on the outskirts of Eluru and announced that the state government was planning to establish a museum on Ranga Rao in Eluru.

Srivathsan Nadadhur of The Hindu wrote of him during his birth centenary in 2018 as follows, "S V Ranga Rao’s diction, towering on-screen persona, impressive quirks to his character-sketches, the ability to draw inspiration from society and literature have cemented his ‘irreplaceable’ stature over the years."

CV Aravind of The News Minute wrote of him in 2018, "SV Ranga Rao was ranked on par with the superstars of the 1950s, 60s and 70s such as N. T .Rama Rao, Nageswara Rao, M. G. Ramachandran, and Sivaji Ganesan. Ranga Rao was one of the earliest to be hailed as a ‘method’ actor and a substandard performance from him was simply out of the question. Rated as one of the most dignified and cooperative stars, he was held in high regard by the acting fraternity."

Awards
International honors
Best Actor Award  - 3rd Afro-Asian Film Festival held in Jakarta - (1963) -  for Keechaka in Nartanasala
Special Mention -  8th San Sebastián International Film Festival - (1960) Nammina Bantu

Nandi Award for Best Feature Film (Director)
Chadarangam (1967) - Silver Nandi
Bandhavyalu (1968) - Gold Nandi

Other honors
He was given distinguished titles such as Rashtrapati Award, Viswa Nata Chakravarti, Nata Sarvabhouma, Nata Sekhara, Nata Simha.

Selected filmography

Actor

Director
 Bandhavyalu (1968)
 Chadarangam (1967)

Producer
 Bandhavyalu (1968) (producer)
 Chadarangam (1967) (producer)
 Naadi Aada Janme (1965) (producer)
 Sukhadukhalu (1969)

References

1918 births
1974 deaths
Telugu male actors
Male actors in Tamil cinema
Recipients of the Rashtrapati Award
Tamil Nadu State Film Awards winners
Telugu film directors
Nandi Award winners
20th-century Indian film directors
20th-century Indian male actors
People from Krishna district
Male actors from Andhra Pradesh
Indian male film actors
Male actors in Telugu cinema
Telugu film producers
Film directors from Andhra Pradesh
Film producers from Andhra Pradesh